In mathematics, signed frequency (negative and positive frequency) expands upon the concept of frequency, from just an absolute value representing how often some repeating event occurs, to also have a positive or negative sign representing one of two opposing orientations for occurrences of those events. The following examples help illustrate the concept:
 For a rotating object, the absolute value of its frequency of rotation indicates how many rotations the object completes per unit of time, while the sign could indicate whether it is rotating clockwise or counterclockwise.
 Mathematically speaking, the vector  has a positive frequency of +1 radian per unit of time and rotates counterclockwise around the unit circle, while the vector  has a negative frequency of -1 radian per unit of time, which rotates clockwise instead.
 For a harmonic oscillator such as a pendulum, the absolute value of its frequency indicates how many times it swings back and forth per unit of time, while the sign could indicate in which of the two opposite directions it started moving.
 For a periodic function represented in a Cartesian coordinate system, the absolute value of its frequency indicates how often in its domain it repeats its values, while changing the sign of its frequency could represent a reflection around its y-axis.

Sinusoids
Let  be a nonnegative angular frequency with units of radians per unit of time and let  be a phase in radians. A function  has slope  When used as the argument of a sinusoid,  can represent a negative frequency.

Because cosine is an even function, the negative frequency sinusoid  is indistinguishable from the positive frequency sinusoid 

Similarly, because sine is an odd function, the negative frequency sinusoid  is indistinguishable from the positive frequency sinusoid  or 

Thus any sinusoid can be represented in terms of positive frequencies only.

The sign of the underlying phase slope is ambiguous. Because  leads  by  radians (or  cycle) for positive frequencies and lags by the same amount for negative frequencies, the ambiguity about the phase slope is resolved simply by observing a cosine and sine operator simultaneously and seeing which one leads the other.

since  and  can be separately observed and compared.

The sum of an analytic representation with its complex conjugate extracts the actual real-valued function they represent. For instance:

which gives rise to the somewhat misleading interpretation that  comprises both a positive and a negative frequency. But the "sum" involves a cancellation of all imaginary components . That cancellation merely results in an ambiguity about the sign of the frequency. Using either sign provides an equivalent representation of the same cosine wave.

In any measure that indicates both frequencies, one of the two frequencies is a false positive or alias of the other, because  can have only one sign.

Applications

Simplifying the Fourier transform 
Perhaps the most well-known application of negative frequency is the formula:

which is a measure of the energy in function  at frequency  When evaluated for a continuum of argument  the result is called the Fourier transform.

For instance, consider the function:

And:

Note that although most functions do not comprise infinite duration sinusoids, that idealization is a common simplification that facilitates understanding.

Looking at the first term of this result, when  the negative frequency  cancels the positive frequency, leaving just the constant coefficient  (because ), which causes the infinite integral to diverge.  At other values of  the residual oscillations cause the integral to converge to zero.  This idealized Fourier transform is usually written as:

For realistic durations, the divergences and convergences are less extreme, and smaller non-zero convergences (spectral leakage) appear at many other frequencies, but the concept of negative frequency still applies.  Fourier's original formulation (the sine transform and the cosine transform) requires an integral for the cosine and another for the sine.  And the resultant trigonometric expressions are often less tractable than complex exponential expressions.  (see Analytic signal, and Phasor)

Sampling of positive and negative frequencies and aliasing

See also
Angle#Sign

Notes

Further reading
 Positive and Negative Frequencies
 Lyons, Richard G. (Nov 11, 2010). Chapt 8.4. Understanding Digital Signal Processing (3rd ed.). Prentice Hall. 944 pgs. .
 

Waves
Concepts in physics